Wan-Chun Alex Ma (born 1978) is a Taiwanese software engineer.

Ma was born in 1978. Ma became interested in visual effects at a young age, influenced by the Star Wars film series and Wing Commander III: Heart of the Tiger, a video game released in 1994. He completed his bachelor's, master's, and doctoral degrees at National Taiwan University. With the help of the Graduate Student Study Abroad Program of Taiwan's National Science Council. Ma went to the University of Southern California in 2005, completing his studies under Paul Debevec at the Institute for Creative Technologies. Since obtaining his doctorate, Ma has worked for Activision and Google.

In 2019, Debevec's research team, including Ma, were jointly awarded an Academy Award for Technical Achievement for the development of the
Polarized Spherical Gradient Illumination, a facial appearance capture and modeling technology used in several films.

References

External links

Software engineers
21st-century engineers
Google employees
Taiwanese expatriates in the United States
Activision
National Taiwan University alumni
Taiwanese engineers
Academy Award for Technical Achievement winners
1978 births
Living people